The Whitman Glacier is a medium-sized glacier on the eastern flank of Little Tahoma Peak, a sub-peak of Mount Rainier in Washington. As the Whitman Glacier flows southeast, the Whitman Crest bounds the glacier to the northeast. The small Ohanapecosh Glacier lies east of the terminus. Meltwater from the glacier drains into the Cowlitz River.

See also
List of glaciers

References

External links

Glaciers of Mount Rainier
Glaciers of Washington (state)